Homelix albofasciata is a species of beetle in the family Cerambycidae. It was described by James Thomson in 1858, originally spelled as "Homelix albo-fasciata". It is known from Gabon.

References

Endemic fauna of Gabon
Phrynetini
Beetles described in 1858